Almerindo Spadetta (April 1894) was a prolific opera librettist active in Naples. He worked as a stage manager at the Teatro San Carlo, Teatro Nuovo, and Teatro del Fondo in Naples for over 40 years and wrote numerous libretti (mostly in the opera buffa genre) for composers associated with those theatres. His most enduring work was the libretto for Nicola De Giosa's Don Checco, one of the last great successes in the history of Neapolitan opera buffa.

Spadetta was a lawyer by training and apparently spent some of his career in Malta, but little else has been written about his life. According to his obituary in the Gazzetta Musicale di Milano, he spent his last years in San Giovanni a Teduccio, a small town in the suburbs of Naples. He died there in 1894, long-forgotten and in dire poverty.

Libretti
Spadetta's libretti include:
Elvina (opera semiseria in 3 acts); composed by Nicola De Giosa; premiered Teatro Nuovo, Naples, 1845
 Pulcinella e la fortuna, (azione allegorica in 5 acts), composed by Vincenzo Fioravanti; premiered Teatro Nuovo, Naples, 24 January 1847
 Carlotta e Werter (opera semiseria in 2 acts); composed by Mario Aspa; premiered Teatro Nuovo, Naples, 1849
 Il pirata, (opera buffa in 5 acts; composed by Vincenzo Fioravanti; premiered Teatro Nuovo, Naples, 1849 
 Don Checco (opera buffa in 2 acts); composed by Nicola De Giosa premiered Teatro Nuovo, Naples, 1850
 Il coscritto (melodramma in 4 parts); composed by Mario Aspa;  premiered  Teatro del Fondo, Naples, 1851
Il signor Pipino (opera buffa in 3 acts) composed by Vincenzo Fioravanti; premiered Teatro Nuovo, Naples, 1856
Cicco e Cola (opera buffa in 4 acts); composed by Alfonso Buonomo; premiered Teatro Nuovo, Naples, 1857
I due mariti (commedia lirica in 3 acts); composed by Nicola D'Arienzo; premiered Teatro Bellini, Naples, 1 February 1866
Tizio, Cajo e Sempronio (opera buffa in 3 acts);  composed by Alfonso Buonomo; premiered Teatro Fenice, Naples, 1867
Le rose (commedia lirica in 3 acts); composed by Nicola D'Arienzo; premiered Teatro Bellini, Naples, February 1868 
Il cacciatore delle Alpi (azione semiseria in 1 act); composed by Nicola D'Arienzo; premiered Teatrino del Collegio dei Nobili, Naples, 23 June 1870 
Zorilla (melodramma giocoso in 3 acts); composed by Antonio Nani; premiered Teatro Rossini, Naples, 1872
Il cuoco e il segretario (opera buffa in 3 acts, after Eugène Scribe); composed by Nicola D'Arienzo; premiered Teatro Rossini, Naples, 11 January 1873
I viaggi (commedia lirica in 3 acts); composed by Nicola D'Arienzo; premiered Teatro Castelli, Milan, 23 June 1875.

References

1822 births
1894 deaths
Italian opera librettists
19th-century Neapolitan people
19th-century Italian writers
19th-century Italian male writers